Serra Monte Cristo is a Brazilian mountain range located within the state of Mato Grosso.

The range is protected by the  Serra de Santa Bárbara State Park, created in 1997.

References 

Monte Cristo
Landforms of Mato Grosso
Highest points of Brazilian states